Borispol is a rural locality (a selo) in Frolovsky Selsoviet of Seryshevsky District, Amur Oblast, Russia. The population was 210 as of 2018. There are 5 streets.

Geography 
Borispol is located 21 km southeast of Seryshevo (the district's administrative centre) by road. Frolovka is the nearest rural locality.

References 

Rural localities in Seryshevsky District